"We're Not Making Love No More" is a song performed by American contemporary R&B group Dru Hill, released as a single from the soundtrack to the film Soul Food. The song peaked at #13 on the Billboard Hot 100 and at #2 on the Billboard R&B chart.

The single was certified gold on December 23, 1997.

Music video
The official music video for the song was directed by Christopher Erskin.

Track listing

Credits and personnel
Credits adapted from the liner notes of the Soul Food Soundtrack.

Dru Hill: vocals
Babyface: writer, composer, producer, keyboards and drum programming, background vocals
Daryl Simmons: producer
Greg Phillinganes: piano
Nathan East: bass
Manny Marroquin and Paul Boutin: recording engineers
Jon Gass: mix engineer
Paul Boutin: assistant mix engineer
Randy Walker: midi programming
Ivy Skoff: production coordinator

Charts

Weekly charts

Year-end charts

Certifications

References

External links
 
 

1997 singles
Dru Hill songs
LaFace Records singles
Music videos directed by Christopher Erskin
Song recordings produced by Babyface (musician)
Song recordings produced by Daryl Simmons
Songs written by Babyface (musician)
1997 songs
Contemporary R&B ballads